Vardadzor or Pirjamal is a village de facto in the Askeran Province of the breakaway Republic of Artsakh, de jure in the Khojaly District of Azerbaijan, in the disputed region of Nagorno-Karabakh. The village has an ethnic Armenian-majority population, and also had an Armenian majority in 1989.

History 
The village was founded in the 12th century. The village was destroyed during the Armenian–Tatar massacres of 1905–1907, and was later rebuilt in 1918. During the Soviet period, the village was part of the Askeran District of the Nagorno-Karabakh Autonomous Oblast.

Historical heritage sites 
Historical heritage sites in and around the village include a 17th/18th-century shrine, an 18th/19th-century cemetery, and the 19th-century church of Surb Astvatsatsin.

Economy and culture 
The population is mainly engaged in agriculture and animal husbandry. As of 2015, the village has a municipal building, a house of culture and a medical centre. Students study in the secondary school of the neighboring village of Nakhichevanik. The community of Vardadzor includes the village of Varazabun.

Demographics 
The village had 223 inhabitants in 2005, and 267 inhabitants in 2015.

Gallery

References

External links 
 
 

Populated places in Askeran Province
Populated places in Khojaly District